The Elgin-Middlesex Detention Centre also known as EMDC, is a 450-bed maximum security jail located in London, Ontario. Concerns have recently been raised about the security of the inmates at the prison as well as prison overcrowding.

There have been twenty deaths since 2009: 

 Randy Drysdale (April 2009)
 Laura Straughan (November 13, 2009)
 Adam Kargus (October 31, 2013) 
 Keith Patterson (September 29, 2014) 
 Jamie High (December 23, 2014) 
 Floyd Deleary (August 23, 2015) 
 Justin Thompson (October 31, 2016) 
 Raymond George Major (June 6, 2017) 
 Michael Fall (July 30, 2017) 
 Murray Davis (August 17, 2017) 
 Ronald Jenkins (December 9, 2017) 
 Justin Struthers (December 26, 2017)
 James Pigeau (January 7, 2018)
 Sean William Tourand-Brightman (March 31, 2019)
 Chase Blanchard (June 22, 2019)  
 Malcolm Ripley (November 25, 2020)
 Tyler Lancha (March 21, 2021)
 Clayton (Danny) Bissonnette 61-year-old man (March 24, 2021)
 Brandon Marchant (July 6, 2021) 
 Jamie Briggs (November 16, 2022)

Inmates' deaths ranged from natural causes (pneumonia) to suicide/homicide and drug overdose. Most of the deaths are handled by Kevin Egan, a lawyer and advocate for inmates at EMDC. Egan is also a part of a class action lawsuit filed on behalf of 10,000 inmates for CAD$325 million in damages against the Government of Ontario.

See also
List of correctional facilities in Ontario

References

External links
 Information and visiting hours – Ontario Ministry of Community Safety & Correctional Services

Buildings and structures in London, Ontario
Prisons in Ontario
1977 establishments in Ontario